Dioncophyllum is a monotypic genus of flowering plants belonging to the family Dioncophyllaceae. The only species is Dioncophyllum thollonii.

Its native range is Western Central Tropical Africa.

References

Caryophyllales
Monotypic Caryophyllales genera